Jordan Baldwindson (born 11 October 1994) is an English professional rugby league footballer who plays as a  or  for the Bradford Bulls in the RFL Championship.

He played for the Leeds Rhinos in the Super League. Baldwinson was contracted to the New Zealand Warriors in the NRL, and spent time on loan from the Warriors at the Bradford Bulls in the Super League. He spent a season at Featherstone Rovers in the Championship, before returning to Leeds in the top flight, whilst spending time back at Featherstone on loan in the second tier. Baldwinson has also played for Wakefield Trinity in the Super League, and on loan from Wakefield at the Leigh Centurions, Halifax and York in the Championship.

Background
Baldwinson was born in Leeds, West Yorkshire, England. He was brought up in Beeston, Leeds and attended Cockburn High School in Leeds.

Career

Leeds Rhinos
Baldwinson made his début in 2013 against Widnes Vikings in Round 4. His next appearance would be in Round 19 against Huddersfield. At the end of the season it was announced he had signed a two-year deal with New Zealand Warriors after making only two appearances for Leeds.

New Zealand Warriors
Baldwinson signed a two-year deal with NRL side New Zealand Warriors, and started out in the Under 20 reserve grade.

Bradford Bulls
Halfway through the 2014 season he returned to England on loan with Bradford Bulls making his début against Catalans Dragons. He went on to make five appearances for the Bradford side in 2015 before being released by New Zealand Warriors at the end of the season.

Featherstone Rovers
In 2015, Baldwinson signed a one-year deal with Championship side Featherstone Rovers in their bid to earn promotion to Super League. Featherstone finished the season 5th just outside Qualifiers, ending their hopes of promotion but went on to play in the Championship Shield where they beat London Broncos in the final. Baldwinson made 31 appearances for Featherstone, scoring one try. He was also named young Championship player of the year.

Leeds Rhinos
Baldwinson returned to Leeds after signing a new deal to play for them in 2016.

Wakefield Trinity
In August 2017 Baldwinson signed for Wakefield Trinity on a two-year deal from the start of the 2018 season.

Halifax
In 2018 Baldwinson played on loan for Halifax in the Betfred Championship.

Bradford Bulls
On 29 September 2021 it was reported that he had signed for Bradford in the RFL Championship.

Honours
Championship Shield: 2015

References

External links
Wakefield Trinity profile
Leeds Rhinos profile
SL profile

1994 births
Living people
Bradford Bulls players
English rugby league players
Featherstone Rovers players
Halifax R.L.F.C. players
Leeds Rhinos players
Leigh Leopards players
People educated at Cockburn School, Leeds
People from Beeston, Leeds
Rugby league locks
Rugby league players from Leeds
Wakefield Trinity players
York City Knights players